Isla Norman-Bell (born 21 February 2000) is an English rugby union player.

Born in Gillingham, Kent, England, but brought up from the age of two in New Zealand, Norman-Bell was first called up your train with England sevens in December 2021. Prior to this, Norman-Bell attended the University of Auckland, and in 2019 she was named their sportswoman of the year. She was given a place on the New Zealand Women’s Sevens Development team to tour internationally and later played for the New Zealand Open Women’s Touch team at the World Championships in Malaysia. Norman-Bell was named in the 2019 Vodafone Warriors Women’s team that played in the NRL Touch Premiership, and played on the wing for Auckland Storm in the Farah Palmer Cup.

Norman-Bell was selected to play for England at the 2022 Commonwealth Games in rugby sevens. She was named in the England squad for the 2022 Rugby World Cup Sevens – Women's tournament held in Cape Town, South Africa in September 2022.

References

 

2000 births
Living people
Female rugby union players
England women's international rugby union players
English female rugby union players